The Assistant to the Secretary of Defense for Public Affairs, or ATSD (PA), is the principal staff advisor and assistant to the Secretary of Defense and Deputy Secretary of Defense for public information, internal information, community relations, information training, and audiovisual matters in support of Department of Defense activities, leading a worldwide public affairs community of some 3,800 military and civilian personnel. The Assistant to the Secretary follows the Secretary's Principles of Information in providing Defense Department information to the public, the United States Congress and the media.

Prior to October 2012, the position was known as the "Assistant Secretary of Defense for Public Affairs", and was retitled in response to the Presidential Appointment Efficiency and Streamlining Act of 2011.

The ATSD(PA) is the principal but not the sole spokesperson for the Department. In July 2011, the ASD(PA) announced the appointment of two additional spokespersons for the Department. George E. Little, one of two Deputy Assistant Secretaries of Defense for Public Affairs, served concurrently as the Pentagon Press Secretary. Little stepped down Nov. 15, 2013. Navy Rear Admiral John Kirby served alongside Little as Deputy Assistant Secretary of Defense for Media Operations and Spokesman. Kirby stepped down as spokesman in February 2015. Both Little and Kirby served as spokespeople for the Secretary of Defense and for the Department. In August 2022, after ATSD(PA) Kirby vacated the role, a separate Department of Defense Press Secretary position was split off and filled by Patrick S. Ryder, with the ATSD(PA) later announced as Chris Meagher in September.

Roles and responsibilities
ASD PA manages the following critical functions: community and public outreach, press operations, speechwriting, news analysis, communications planning. The ASD PA:
 Serves as the principal spokesperson for the Department of Defense and is the sole release authority for official DoD information to news media representatives.
 Ensures free flow of information to the news media, service members and families, Congress, partners, and the general public at large.
 Develops and maintains relationships with the news media based on trust and integrity, on behalf of the Department leadership, to ensure honest forthright reporting about the Department.
 Provides the critical link between DoD and the American people to ensure the efforts of service members are told in a timely and accurate manner and that information is only constrained by national security requirements.
 Responsible for ensuring media representatives are given maximum access to ongoing military operations, including in Iraq and Afghanistan, to provide fair and accurate reporting.
 Develops communications policies, plans, and programs in support of DoD objectives and operations.
 Integrates social and online media tools into the department's communication strategy to maximize our ability to communicate timely information to traditional and non-traditional audiences.

In addition, the ASD PA exercises authority, direction, and control over the Defense Media Activity (DMA). DMA provides news and information to our over one million service members stationed at home and around the world via broadcast, radio, web, and periodicals. DMA also trains DoD and other Federal Department public affairs professionals.

The ASD PA is supported by the following divisions:

Press operations
 Provides expert advice and counsel to the Secretary of Defense, the Deputy Secretary, the Under Secretaries and every key organization with the DoD to ensure timely and accurate information is provided to the media, Congress, and the public at large.
 In 2010, conducted more than 200 press briefings in the Pentagon Briefing Room per year including 13 briefings by the Secretary of Defense; supported 41 press briefings during Secretary of Defense travels.
 Coordinates and releases approximately 1,250 news releases/advisories a year.
 Arranges more than 1,200 media interviews and responded to thousands of queries, resulting in a countless number of press articles, broadcasts, and online media postings.
 Provides guidance to the communications shops for all the Services, CoComs and Under Secretaries of Defense on media issues to include formal exercise and contingency operations public affairs guidance.

Speechwriting
 Prepares more than 50 major speeches and congressional testimonies each year to communicate the Secretary's goals and priorities for the Department in a way that has impact in the media, the general public and within the U.S. military.

Communications planning and integration (CPI)
 Interfaces with planners in OSD Policy, Joint Staff, Combatant Commands, military services, and the inter-agency to develop communication plans and strategies that accurately reflect U.S. policy goals, objectives and facts.
 Serves as the key communication planning integrator for the DoD and serves as its lead on communication planning interactions with other U.S. Government elements.

Community relations
 Maintains engagement with more than 200 national, regional and local nonprofit organizations that support our service members and military families and provides guidance and counsel to worldwide DoD offices overseeing 2,300 Family Readiness volunteers and coordinators.
 Receives and responds to over 50,000 public queries annually via web, phone, hard copy letters; responds to 2,900 annual public requests for commercial use of DoD imagery.
 Responds to approximately 800 queries per year from non-profit/VSO leadership, congressional offices.
 Conducts the Pentagon tour program for 136,000 visitors per year.
 Conducts the Joint Civilian Orientation Conference (JCOC), a twice annual five-day program that connects prominent business and community leaders with senior military officials and troops on the ground.

Defense Media Activity
 Communicates messages from senior DoD leaders to support and improve quality of life and morale, promote situational awareness, provide timely and immediate force protection information, and sustain readiness. DMA consists of 2,400 employees and has an annual budget of more than $200 million to provide the following services:
 American Forces Network, also known as American Forces Network (AFN), broadcasts multiple television and radio channels providing a "touch of home" for nearly one million members of the military and their families deployed or stationed in 177 countries, to include Afghanistan and Iraq and Navy ships at sea.
 Stars and Stripes is a news and information organization that serves military audiences world-wide. Annual distribution of the newspaper is 33 million copies. Stripes is a journalistic and editorially independent publication provided free to deployed troops.
 Defense Visual Imagery Management Operations Center (DIMOC) collects, distributes and archives on a real-time basis combat camera still and motion imagery depicting U.S. military activities and operations worldwide.
 Defense Information School (DINFOS) provides initial and advanced public affairs and visual information training for military and civilian students of all services and international partners. DINFOS has an annual student load of more than 3200 students and 30 courses of study.
 Public Web supports and manages the hosting for nearly 600 OSD, JCS, combatant command, and military service public-facing web sites.

History

The position was originally established as the Assistant to the Secretary (Director, Office of Public Information) by Secretary James V. Forrestal in July 1948. After Reorganization Plan No.6 of 30 June 1953 increased the number of assistant secretaries, Defense Directive 5122.1 of September 1953 redesignated the post as Assistant Secretary of Defense (Legislative and Public Affairs) 

This position was abolished in February 1957, and functions were divided between two new posts, the Assistant Secretary of Defense (Public Affairs) and an Assistant Secretary of Defense (Legislative Affairs). ASD(PA) was established by Defense Directive 5105.13 of 10 August 1957.

In 1993, the position was changed to Assistant to the Secretary of Defense for Public Affairs, by Defense Directive 5122.5. This bureaucratic distinction was dropped after the National Defense Authorization Act for FY1995 (P.L. 103-337) increased the number of assistant secretaries from 10 to 11. The post was subsequently titled Assistant Secretary of Defense (Public Affairs), referred to as the Assistant Secretary of Defense for Public Affairs, and abbreviated as ASD(PA). In October 2015 the position was retitled again, reverting to Assistant to the Secretary of Defense for Public Affairs, in response to the Presidential Appointment Efficiency and Streamlining Act of 2011.

Officeholders

The table below includes both the various titles of this post over time, as well as all the holders of those offices.

Budget

Budget totals
The annual budget for ASD(PA) is contained in the OSD's budget, under the Defense-Wide Operation and Maintenance (O&M) account.

References

External links
 defense.gov